Salmons is a surname. Alternative spellings include Salmon, Samons, Sammons, and Sammon. The name may refer to:

Geoff Salmons (born 1949), British football player
John Salmons (born 1979), American basketball player
Melissa Salmons (born 1958), American writer 
Stanley Salmons (born 1939), British scientist
Steven Salmons (born 1959), American volleyball player
Tony Salmons (born 1957), American comic book artist

See also
 Salmon (surname)
 Sammon (surname)
 Sammons

English-language surnames